Lyndon B. Johnson (LBJ) National Grassland is a national grassland located in the Great Plains of the northern part of the U.S. state of Texas near Decatur, and within an hour's drive from Fort Worth. It is primarily used for recreation, such as hiking, camping, horseback riding, fishing, and hunting. It is also used as grazing land for cattle and other livestock.

Camping and other activities are free of charge, and visitors may camp in virtually any area of the park.  Both pull-through and hike-in campsites are available.  Some areas require a small fee for use, but these are few and clearly marked.

Named after former U.S. president Lyndon B. Johnson, the park is located primarily in the northern part of Wise County, but a small portion extends northward into southern Montague County. The grassland is administered together with all four national forests and two national grasslands located entirely in Texas, from common offices in Lufkin, Texas. The units include Angelina, Davy Crockett, Sabine, and Sam Houston National Forests, plus Caddo National Grassland and Lyndon B. Johnson. Local ranger district offices are located in Decatur.

See also
List of facilities named after Lyndon Johnson
Rucker Pond

References

External links

 Caddo–LBJ National Grasslands– U.S. Forest Service

Grasslands of Texas
Grasslands of the North American Great Plains
Protected areas of Montague County, Texas
National Grasslands of the United States
Protected areas of Wise County, Texas